Kolotsky is a rural locality (a khutor) in Ilovlinskoye Rural Settlement, Ilovlinsky District, Volgograd Oblast, Russia. The population was 257 as of 2010. There are 22 streets.

Geography 
Kolotsky is located in steppe, on the Volga Upland, 6 km south of Ilovlya (the district's administrative centre) by road. Ilovlya is the nearest rural locality.

References 

Rural localities in Ilovlinsky District